Thangavelu Asokan from the GE India Technology Centre, Bangalore, Karnataka, India was named Fellow of Indian Academy of Sciences in 2012 for contributions to the development technologies for electrical safety.

References

Fellows of the Indian Academy of Sciences
Living people
Year of birth missing (living people)
Place of birth missing (living people)